Herpetocypris is a genus of ostracods belonging to the family Cyprididae.

The genus has cosmopolitan distribution.

Species:
 Herpetocypris amychos Krutak, 1975
 Herpetocypris bonettoi Ferguson

References

Cyprididae